Aleksandrina Naydenova (born 29 February 1992) is a Bulgarian former professional tennis player.

On 9 September 2019, she reached her highest singles ranking of 218 by the Women's Tennis Association (WTA) whilst her best doubles ranking is No. 95, achieved on 25 September 2017.

Suspension and ban
On 27 December 2019, Naydenova was given a provisional suspension by the Tennis Integrity Unit (TIU) for several cases of suspected match-fixing between 2015 and 2019. After months of appealing in to the TIU in the Independent Anti-Corruption Hearing, in late November 2020, Naydenova was banned from professional tennis for life for 13 charges; 12 cases of match-fixing across WTA Tour and ITF Women's Circuit, and one relating to numerous incidents of non-cooperation with the TIU during the investigation process. The then 28-year-old from Plovdiv was also fined US$ 150,000. She was ranked No. 239 in singles at the time of her suspension.

WTA 125 tournament finals

Doubles: 1 (runner-up)

ITF Circuit finals

Singles: 20 (10 titles, 10 runner–ups)

Doubles 31 (14 titles, 17 runner–ups)

References

External links
 
 
 

1992 births
Living people
Sportspeople from Plovdiv
Bulgarian female tennis players
Match fixers
Tennis controversies
Sportspeople involved in betting scandals
Match fixing in tennis
Sportspeople banned for life
21st-century Bulgarian women